Gorica Popović (born 13 August 1952) is a Serbian theatre, television and film actress. She was also a former member of the rock band Suncokret.

Selected filmography

Film

References

External links

1952 births
20th-century Serbian actresses
21st-century Serbian actresses
20th-century Serbian writers
21st-century Serbian writers
Living people
Golden Arena winners
Actors from Kragujevac
Serbian actresses
Yugoslav women singers
Yugoslav rock singers
Serbian rock singers
Serbian film actresses
Serbian stage actresses
Serbian television actresses
Serbian voice actresses
Serbian screenwriters
Serbian theatre directors
Serbian film directors
Žanka Stokić award winners